Asraf Rashid (born 27 August 1985) is a professional football player who plays for Tanjong Pagar United in the S.League as a left midfielder.

Club career
Asraf started his S.League career playing for Woodlands Wellington, before joining Home United and eventually settling at Tanjong Pagar United.

Honours
Tanjong Pagar United
Singapore Cup: 2011

References

External links
 

Living people
Singaporean footballers
1985 births
Woodlands Wellington FC players
Home United FC players
Tanjong Pagar United FC players
Singapore Premier League players
Association football midfielders